The Star of India refers to a group of flags used during the period of the British Raj in the Indian subcontinent. India had a range of flags for different purposes during its existence. The Princely states had their own flags which were to be flown alongside the British flag as a symbol of suzerainty. The official state flag for use on land was the Union Flag of the United Kingdom and it was this flag that was lowered on Independence Day in 1947. The flag of the governor-general of India was defaced with the Star of India. The civil ensign and naval ensign were the Red Ensign or Blue Ensign, respectively, defaced with the Star of India emblem.

History
Ideas for a flag for areas under British India were initially imperial ones, rather than nationalist ones. After the Indian Rebellion of 1857 and the later establishment of the British Raj, a representative symbol of the new government was pending. Various designs were proposed for the first Star of India flag in 1863, keeping similar flag designs adopted in other British colonies such as Canada and Australia, combining symbols of Imperial authority such as the Union Jack, the royal crown, with symbols specific to the colony in question.

Company flag

Upon receiving Royal Assent to trade in the Indian Ocean by Queen Elizabeth I in 1600, the English East India Company adopted a flag of thirteen red and white stripes with the flag of England in canton. The flag in the canton eventually changed to the flag of Great Britain in 1707 and later to the Union Jack in 1801. These flags were also used during the Company rule in India.

After the Indian Rebellion of 1857, the British government passed the Government of India Act 1858, nationalising the East India Company and taking over all of their possessions within India, where they would be considered legally a part of the British Raj. The striped banner of the Company was thus replaced by the Union Jack.

Flags

Blue Ensign

After Queen Victoria became Empress of India through the proclamation of 1876, a naval ensign with the symbol of the Order of the Star of India was warranted by the Admiralty to the Indian Marine in 1877. It was used on vessels of Her Majesty's Indian Marine (Later called the Royal Indian Navy) and for other military and naval purposes.

Its usage was altered from 1928, when the Royal Indian Navy switched to White Ensign as naval ensign, and the Blue Ensign became the naval jack.

Red Ensign

While the Blue Ensign was used for military and naval purposes, the Red Ensign was used as the civil ensign and sometimes represented India in international events, notably in the Declaration by United Nations during World War II. The ensign used on merchant ships registered in British Indian ports was the undefaced red ensign.

Flag of the Viceroy and Governor-General

From around 1885, the viceroy of India was allowed to fly a Union Flag augmented in the centre with the 'Star of India' surmounted by a Crown. It was often used to represent India, acting as an "unofficial national flag", in international events etc. This flag was not the Viceroy's personal flag; it was also used by governors, lieutenant governors, chief commissioners and other British officers in India. When at sea, only the viceroy flew the flag from the mainmast, while other officials flew it from the foremast.

As Independent Dominions

The Star of India series of flags were discontinued from 1947, when the newly independent Dominions of India and Pakistan were established by the Indian Independence Act 1947. The newly formed offices of the governor-generals of India and Pakistan used a dark blue flag bearing the royal crest (a lion standing on the Tudor Crown), beneath which were the words 'INDIA' and 'PAKISTAN' in gold majuscules respectively.

These flags were ultimately discontinued when India and Pakistan when they abolished their Dominion status after becoming constitutional republics in 1950 and 1956 respectively.

Flag of British Indian Army

The British Indian Army used red field emblazoned with Star of India crossed by two swords and beneath the Tudor Crown as ensign and a blue ensign with the Union Flag defaced at the canton, and the Star of India crossed by two swords displayed in the fly as war flag.

Flag of Royal Indian Air Force

The Royal Indian Air Force used the roundel that of Royal Air Force augmented in centre of a star. The roundel is not superimposed on the 'Star of India' as used on the Union Jack and Blue Ensign but some other star. The ensign had a field of air force blue with the United Kingdom's flag in the canton and the Royal Indian Air Force's roundel in the fly.

Proposed flags

Lord Mountbatten, the last Viceroy of India in 1947 proposed two separate flags for India and Pakistan to be used after Partition of India. The flag for India consisted of the flag of the Indian National Congress defaced with a Union Jack in the canton. It was rejected by Nehru, as he felt that the more extremist members of Congress would see the inclusion of the Union Jack on an Indian flag as pandering to the British. The flag for Pakistan consisted  of the flag of the Muslim League defaced with a Union Jack in the canton. It was rejected by Jinnah, as he felt that a flag featuring a Christian Cross alongside the Islamic Crescent would be unacceptable to the Muslims of Pakistan.

Other flags

Flag of Home Rule

Indian Home Rule movement used a five red and four green horizontal stripes flag. On the upper left quadrant was the Union Flag, which signified the Dominion status that the movement sought to achieve. A crescent and a seven-pointed star, both in white, are set in top fly. Seven white stars are arranged as in the Saptarishi constellation (the constellation Ursa Major), which is sacred to Hindus.

Coronation Standard
 
Coronation Standard of British Raj had a Saint George's Cross augmented in the centre with the 'Star of India' surmounted by a Crown.

Flag of Bengal Presidency

The flag of Bengal Presidency had a blue field emblazoned with badge of Bengal. The badge had a passant tiger with a sailing ship below it.

Flag of Indian Local Maritime Government

The ensign of local naval vessels is a usual defaced blue ensign. The badge is a golden lion rampant guardant holding in front paws a crown. It was not a naval ensign, but the Indian equivalent of a colonial Blue Ensign as used on unarmed vessels.

Flag of Commissioners of the Port of Calcutta

On 1 February 1896 an Admiralty Warrant was issued for a Red Ensign defaced by the badge of the Commissioners of the Port of Calcutta as the flag of Commissioners of the Port of Calcutta

Flag of the Conservator of the Port of Bombay

Admiralty Letter, of 19th August 1880 authorised a special flag for the Conservator of the Port of Bombay. Red St George's cross on a white field with three narrower horizontal red stripes in each quarter and a large circular badge in centre. The flag was designed by Captain Sir Henry Morland, of the Royal Indian Marine.

The badge consisted of two oval shields, surmounted by a crown, within a red ring bearing the words Conservator of the Port of Bombay. The sinister shield has the four quarters of the flag of the Trustees without the blue St George's cross, while the dexter shield is from the 1877 arms of the City of Bombay; a red lion passant guardant, flanked on each side by an ostrich feather, (alluding to the visit of Edward VII when he was Prince of Wales), above three, three-masted dhows, known as pattimars. Bombay was the first city in the Empire, outside the British Isles, to which arms were granted.

Flag of the Trustees of the Port of Bombay

An Admiralty Letter authorised a special flag for the Trustees of the Port of Bombay. Blue St George's cross with a maritime scene in each quarter; in the first quarter, a lighthouse, in the second a screw-steamer with auxiliary sails, in the third a dhow, and in the fourth a signal station at the end of a harbour wall.

Flag of State's Merchant

Emblem

The Star of India was the symbol of the Order of the Star of India, a chivalric order of knighthood. It was a rayed five-pointed silver star, decorated with diamonds and surrounded by a sunburst having twenty-six large rays alternating with twenty-six small rays. In the centre of the sunburst was a light blue ribbon bearing the motto of the Order, . The motto chosen was neutral so as to appeal to people of different faiths due to the religious diversity of India, with Heaven also referring to the stars, and their light that sailors used to circumnavigate to India. Unlike most British symbols, the Star did not have Christian connotations, as they were deemed unacceptable to the Indian Princes.

Legacy
The flags were replaced by the Tiraṅgā (Indian Tricolour) after Independence on 15 August 1947 in the independent Dominion of India, and by the Parc̱am-e Sitārah o-Hilāl (Flag of the Star and Crescent) in the independent Dominion of Pakistan, which used the star as the basis of its Coat of Arms.

During British rule, the emblem was used as a basis for many emblems of British India and continues to be incorporated in the logos of many organisations in modern India, such as The Oriental Insurance Company, the Board of Control for Cricket in India and the Indian Olympic Association. Although the official status of the Star of India emblem lapsed following Indian independence, in May 1949 Lord Mountbatten, the last British Governor-General of India and the last Grand Master of the Order of the Star of India, suggested incorporating the five-pointed star device of the emblem, or another form of star, into the rank insignia of the Indian Armed Forces as a replacement for the British Bath Star or "pip". His recommendation was accepted, and Indian Army rank insignia continue to include five-pointed stars.

List of flags used in British India

Notes

References

Government of British India
Flags of India
India
British East India Company
Military history of British India